Prince He of the First Rank (hošoi hūwaliyaka cin wang), or simply Prince He, was the title of a princely peerage used in China during the Manchu-led Qing dynasty (1636–1912). As the Prince He peerage was not awarded "iron-cap" status, this meant that each successive bearer of the title would normally start off with a title downgraded by one rank vis-à-vis that held by his predecessor. However, the title would generally not be downgraded to any lower than a feng'en fuguo gong except under special circumstances.

The first bearer of the title was Hongzhou (1712–1770), the fifth son of the Yongzheng Emperor. In 1733, he was awarded the status of a qinwang (prince of the first rank) by his father under the title "Prince He of the First Rank". The title was passed down over seven generations and was held by eight persons.

Members of the Prince He peerage

 Hongzhou (1712–1770), the Yongzheng Emperor's fifth son, held the title Prince He of the First Rank from 1733 to 1770, posthumously honoured as Prince Hegong of the First Rank (和恭親王)
 Yongbi (永璧; 1733–1772), Hongzhou's second son, held the title of a buru bafen fuguo gong from 1757 to 1770, held the title Prince He of the First Rank from 1770 to 1772, posthumously honoured as Prince Heqin of the First Rank (和勤親王)
 Mianlun (綿倫; 1752–1775), Yongbi's eldest son, held the title Prince He of the Second Rank from 1772 to 1774, posthumously honoured as Prince Hejin of the Second Rank (和謹郡王), had no male heir
 Mianxun (綿循; 1758–1817), Yongbi's fourth son, held the title Prince He of the Second Rank from 1775 to 1817, posthumously honoured as Prince Heke of the Second Rank (和恪郡王)
 Yiheng (奕亨; 1783–1832), Mianxun's third son, held the title of a beile from 1817 to 1832
 Zairong (載容; 1824–1881), Yiheng's fourth son, held the title of a beizi from 1832 to 1881, awarded the status but not the title of a beile in 1872, posthumously honoured as Minke Beizi (敏恪貝子)
 Pulian (溥廉; 1854–1898), Zairong's eldest son, held the title of a second class fuguo jiangjun from 1877 to 1881, held the title of a feng'en zhenguo gong from 1881 to 1898
 Yuzhang (毓璋; 1889–1937), Pulian's second son, held the title of a feng'en zhenguo gong from 1898 to 1937
 Hengde (恆德; b. 1908), Yuzhang's son
 Qitai (啟泰; b. 1925), Hengde's son
 Puyi (溥益), Zairong's second son, held the title of a second class fuguo jiangjun from 1877 to 1907
 Yushu (毓書), Puyi's eldest son, held the title of a fengguo jiangjun from 1907 to 1945
 Hengjun (恆鋆), Yushu's eldest son
 Pushou (溥綬), Zairong's third son, held the title of a second class fuguo jiangjun from 1877 to 1906
 Yicong (奕聰), Mianxun's fourth son, held the title of a third class zhenguo jiangjun from 1805 to 1836
 Zaijia (載嘉), Yicong's eldest son, held the title of a third class fuguo jiangjun from 1836 to 1884
 Yijin (奕謹), Mianxun's sixth son, held the title of a third class zhenguo jiangjun from 1808 to 1826, had no male heir
 Yirui (奕蕋), Mianxun's ninth son, held the title of a fengguo jiangjun from 1821 to 1839, had no male heir
 Yongbin (永璸; 1735–1799), Hongzhou's fourth son, held the title of a second class zhenguo jiangjun from 1754 to 1798
 Mianming (綿命), Yongbin's second son, held the title of a fuguo jiangjun from 1798 to 1832
 Yijun (奕俊), Mianming's eldest son, held the title of a fengguo jiangjun from 1832 to 1843, had no male heir
 Yimeng (奕猛), Mianming's second son, held the title of a fengguo jiangjun from 1836 to 1859, stripped of his title in 1859, had no male heir
 Yonghuan (永瑍; 1740–1783), Hongzhou's sixth son, held the title of a second class zhenguo jiangjun from 1779 to 1783
 Mianseng (綿僧), Yonghuan's eldest son, held the title of a fuguo jiangjun from 1783 to 1807
 Yijiao (奕交), Mianseng's eldest son, held the title of a fengguo jiangjun from 1807 to 1859
 Yilie (奕烈), Mianseng's second son, held the title of a fengguo jiangjun from 1815 to 1851
 Zaitou (載透), Yilie's third son, held the title of a feng'en jiangjun from 1852 to 1870, stripped of his title in 1870
 Yongkun (永琨; 1743–1803), Hongzhou's seventh son, held the title of a buru bafen fuguo gong from 1768 to 1803
 Mianling (綿令), Yongkun's eldest son, held the title of a third class fuguo jiangjun from 1784 to 1797
 Yihuang (奕煌), Mianling's eldest son, held the title of a second class fengguo jiangjun from 1797 to 1798
 Mianzhong (綿仲), Yongkun's second son, held the title of a third class zhenguo jiangjun from 1803 to 1814
 Yishun (奕順), Mianzhong's eldest son, held the title of a fuguo jiangjun from 1814 to 1841
 Zaichou (載疇), Yishun's eldest son, held the title of a fengguo jiangjun from 1842 to 1862, stripped of his title in 1862
 Mianzhuo (綿倬), Yongkun's fifth son, held the title of a third class zhenguo jiangjun from 1784 to 1787, had no male heir
 Yiheng (奕亨), Mianxun's third son, held the title of a fuguo jiangjun from 1802 to 1817, became a beile in 1817
 Zaichong (載崇), Yiheng's fifth son, held the title of a first class fuguo jiangjun from 1826 to 1876
 Pushan (溥善), Zaichong's eldest son, held the title of a fengguo jiangjun from 1876
 Yuhou (毓厚; b. 1938), Pushan's son
 Hengyin (恆蔭), Yuhou's eldest son, held the title of a feng'en jiangjun
 Puliang (溥良; 1854–1922), Zaichong's second son, held the title of a fengguo jiangjun from 1886 to 1922
 Yulong (毓隆; 1872–1923), Puliang's son
 Hengtong (恆同), Yulong's son
 Qigong (1912–2005), Hengtong's son, held the title of a feng'en jiangjun from 1922 to 1945
 Puxing (溥興; died 1907), Zaichong's third son, held the title of a fengguo jiangjun from 1880 to 1907
 Yusong (毓崧; b. 1909), Puxing's eldest son, held the title of a feng'en jiangjun from 1907 to 1945

Family tree

See also
 Royal and noble ranks of the Qing dynasty

References
 

Qing dynasty princely peerages
Peerages of the Plain Blue Banner